The A.H. Brown Public Library, also known as the Mobridge Public Library, on N. Main St. in Mobridge, South Dakota, was built in 1930.  It was listed on the National Register of Historic Places in 1978.

It was designed by architect George Fossum, of Aberdeen, South Dakota.  Its NRHP nomination argues that the building is one of Mobridge's most important buildings" and that it "provides a good example of the type of architecture prevalent during the eclectic period: The library borrows from the classical, Jacobethan, and English Medieval modes. The library has been and continues to be a purveyor of educational material to the community. Also the building is important because it represents the philanthropy of A.H.Brown, a successful local businessman."

References

Libraries in South Dakota
National Register of Historic Places in South Dakota
Tudor Revival architecture in the United States
Library buildings completed in 1930
Walworth County, South Dakota